Byron F. Eby (December 11, 1904 – September 11, 1990) was an American football back who played one season with the Portsmouth Spartans of the National Football League. He played college football at Ohio State University and attended Chillicothe High School in Chillicothe, Ohio.

References

External links
Just Sports Stats

1904 births
1990 deaths
Players of American football from Ohio
American football running backs
American football quarterbacks
Ohio State Buckeyes football players
Portsmouth Spartans players
People from Circleville, Ohio